World Group may refer to:
 In Davis Cup structure, the World Group groups the top national men's tennis teams
 In Fed Cup structure, World Group I and World Group II are the top and next-to-top national women's tennis teams
 World Group Securities, registered NASD broker-dealer

See also
 One World Group, airline alliance